DMC Sinai-Grace Hospital is the largest of the eight hospitals that comprise the Detroit Medical Center. Located in northwest Detroit, Sinai-Grace provides health care services in over 40 specialties and has 334 inpatient beds, is a full-service hospital including comprehensive cardiac care, stroke, surgical intensive care, medical intensive care, trauma and emergency medicine, cancer treatment, general and robotic surgeries, women's health, urology, gastrointestinal, gerontology, obstetrics/gynecology and cosmetic/plastic surgery. 

Sinai-Grace's Joint Excel Plus program features a minimally invasive knee and hip replacement surgery. Sinai-Grace also operates more than 25 outpatient care sites and ambulatory surgery centers throughout Wayne and Oakland Counties. Sinai-Grace is one of 10 hospitals in the nation to be awarded a Robert Wood Johnson Foundation grant to set the standards of cardiac care for hospitals and physicians throughout the nation. U.S. News & World Report named Sinai-Grace Hospital as high performing in 2 adult procedures and conditions.

More than 200 medical students and resident physicians in a variety of medical and surgical specialties get their advanced training at Sinai-Grace every year. In addition, nursing and medical students, radiology technicians, pharmacists, physician assistants, pathologists' assistants, and chaplains train at the hospital.

History 
In April 1999, two hospitals with roots in the community since 1888 consolidated services under one roof. The former Sinai and Grace hospitals joined to create a community academic hospital in northwest Detroit and relocated to the former Mount Carmel Hospital building. Around April 1991, Grace Hospital had originally merged with Mount Carmel Hospital. The Grace and Mount Carmel hospital staff merged creating the new Grace Hospital at the 6071 West Outer Drive location.

Grace Hospital was established in 1888 and named after Grace McMillan Jarvis, daughter of founder Senator James McMillan. It was located at the corner of Willis and John R. adjacent to the current main campus of the Detroit Medical Center. Grace Hospital opened a training school for nurses in 1889. In 1913, the Miriam Memorial Branch of the hospital opened at the former Vinewood Estate of Bela Hubbard on the north side of Lafayette between West Grand Blvd and Vinewood. It was demolished in 1933.

Sinai Hospital's roots date from a clinic opened by Harry Saltzstein, M.D., in 1922. Sinai Hospital opened its doors in January 1953 to give Jewish healthcare professionals a place to practice without discrimination and as a central institution for the Jewish community.

Clinical services 
Clinical Services at DMC Sinai-Grace Hospital include:

 Audiology
 Cardiology
 Cosmetic/Plastic Surgery
 Critical Care
 Dermatology
 Diabetes
 Ear/Nose/Throat
 Emergency Medicine
 Endocrinology
 Gastroenterology
 Infectious Disease
 Nephrology
 Neurology
 Obstetrics
 Oncology/Hematology
 Ophthalmology
 Oral/Maxillofacial Surgery
 Orthopedics
 Pain Management
 Pediatrics
 Pharmacy
 Physical Medicine/Rehabilitation
 Podiatric Surgery
 Psychiatry
 Radiology
 Rheumatology
 Sleep Disorders
 Surgery
 Urology
 Vascular Services
 Women's Health

Programs and services of note 
DMC Sinai-Grace Hospital offers free health education programs during the fall and spring from the People's Medical College. A few of the classes offered were on:
 Joint Pain
 Allergies
 Fibroids and Menopause
 Diabetes wound care
 Stroke
 Heart Health

Sinai-Grace Hospital was the first hospital in Detroit and among the First in the region to have the Umbilical Cord Blood Bank program.

Surgical  milestones 
Sinai-Grace Hospital was the first hospital in Michigan to offer Blue Light Cystoscopies. One of its other achievements was implementing a historic Uterine Fibroid surgery.

Accreditation 
DMC Sinai-Grace Hospital has been recognized/accredited by several major organizations, including:

 Joint Commission on Accreditation of Healthcare Organizations (JCAHO) – Fully Accredited, 2014.
 MPRO/Michigan Medicare Quality Improvement Organization – Governor's Award.
 The Leapfrog Group – Top Hospital list for patient quality and safety 2012, 2013, 2014.
 U.S. News & World Report – America's Top Hospitals
 Centers for Medicare and Medicaid Services (CMS) and the Federal Department of Health and Human Services ranked above the national average in care for patients with specific types of medical conditions including heart failure and heart attacks.
 HealthGrades’ Stroke Care Excellence Award, Critical Care Award.

References

External links

 Detroit Medical Center
 DMC Sinai-Grace Hospital

Hospitals in Detroit
Teaching hospitals in Michigan
1999 establishments in Michigan
Detroit Medical Center
Tenet Healthcare
Trauma centers